Tomás Yerro Villanueva (11 February 1951 – 10 April 2021) was a Spanish writer, academic, and literary critic.

He received the Premio Príncipe de Viana de la Cultura in 2019.

Publications 
 Lerín. Buque varado sobre el río Ega (2021)
Personas mayores, patrimonio de primera (2020). 
Amado Alonso: el español de las dos orillas (coord. 2014).
 Por la senda del Quijote (coord. 2005).
 Escritores Navarros Actuales: antología (coord. 1990).
 Narrativa Española Actual 1993-1997 (1998).
 Nuevos modos de arte de narrar (1998). 
 Didáctica de la publicidad (Madrid, Ministerio de Educación y Ciencia, 1990)
 ‘Río Arga’, revista poética navarra: estudio y antología (con Charo Fuentes, 1988).
 La lectura creadora (Pamplona, 1988)
 Aspectos técnicos y estructurales de la novela española actual (Pamplona, EUNSA, 1977), investigación pionera en su momento.

References

1951 births
2021 deaths
Spanish writers
Spanish academics
Spanish literary critics
University of Navarra alumni
Academic staff of the University of Navarra
Academic staff of the Public University of Navarre
People from Ribera del Alto Ebro